Gabriele Setario was a Roman Catholic prelate who served as Bishop of Avellino e Frigento (1507–1510) and Bishop of Nardò (1491–1507).

Biography
In 1491, Gabriele Setario was appointed during the papacy of Pope Innocent VIII as Bishop of Nardò. On 27 October 1507, he was appointed during the papacy of Pope Julius II as Bishop of Avellino e Frigento. He served as Bishop of Avellino e Frigento until his resignation in 1510.

References

External links and additional sources
 (for Chronology of Bishops) 
(for Chronology of Bishops) 

15th-century Italian Roman Catholic bishops
16th-century Italian Roman Catholic bishops
Bishops appointed by Pope Innocent VIII
Bishops appointed by Pope Julius II